Gretel Lees Packer  (born August 1965) is an Australian billionaire investor and philanthropist.

Packer is the daughter of Kerry Packer , a media mogul, and his wife, Roslyn Packer . She is the granddaughter of Sir Frank Packer. Following the death of her father and an estimated 1.2 billion settlement in 2015 with her brother, James, she inherited investments in Crown Resorts, and other companies.

Her philanthropic interests include a broad range of community activities and charities aligned to the arts, education, and environmental science. Packer is Vice-President of the Board of Trustees of the Art Gallery of New South Wales, Chair of the Advisory Board of Crown Resorts Foundation, Chair of the Packer Family Foundation, Chair of The Sydney Theatre Company Foundation, and a Founding Patron of the Taronga Zoo Conservation Science Initiative and a Founding Governor of the Taronga Zoo Foundation. She has previously served as a Director of the Royal Hospital for Women Foundation and as a Council Member of the Royal Botanic Gardens Foundation.

Personal life 
Packer had two children to her first husband, Nick Barham, whom she divorced in 1999; and one child to her second husband, Shane Murray, whom she married in late 2005 and divorced in 2007.

Net worth 
In May 2019, Packer's net worth was assessed as 1.16 billion by the Financial Review Rich List, the eightieth richest Australian. Forbes Asia magazine assessed Packer's net worth at 1.6 billion in January 2019, the twenty-sixth richest Australian.

References

Australian billionaires
Australian women philanthropists
Australian philanthropists
1965 births
Date of birth missing (living people)
Packer family
Female billionaires
Living people
Australian women in business
Businesspeople from Sydney
Members of the Order of Australia